Aliabad (also Romanized as ‘Alīābād; also known as Qeshlāq-e ‘Alīābād and Qishlāq ‘Aliābād) is a village in Khoshkrud Rural District, in the Central District of Zarandieh County, Markazi Province, Iran. At the 2006 census, its population was 23, in 6 families.

References 

Populated places in Zarandieh County